Othon Valentim Filho (born 20 December 1944) is a Brazilian former footballer.

References

External links
 Jornal Leopoldinense - Othon Valentim Filho

1944 births
Living people
Brazilian footballers
Brazilian football managers
Expatriate football managers in Kuwait
Expatriate football managers in Saudi Arabia
Expatriate football managers in the United Arab Emirates
Campeonato Brasileiro Série A players
Campeonato Brasileiro Série A managers
Footballers at the 1964 Summer Olympics
Olympic footballers of Brazil
Association football forwards
Botafogo de Futebol e Regatas players
Botafogo de Futebol e Regatas managers
Al-Shabab SC (Kuwait) managers
Al Hilal SFC managers
Al Wahda FC managers
América Futebol Clube (MG) managers
Al Jazira Club managers
Fluminense FC managers
Joinville Esporte Clube managers
São José Esporte Clube managers
Goiás Esporte Clube managers
Goiânia Esporte Clube managers
Atlético Clube Goianiense managers
Ettifaq FC managers
Pan American Games medalists in football
Pan American Games gold medalists for Brazil
Footballers at the 1963 Pan American Games
Medalists at the 1963 Pan American Games
Kuwait Premier League managers
Brazilian expatriate sportspeople in Kuwait